Tooth, Fang & Claw is the seventh and final studio album by The Amboy Dukes, credited as "Ted Nugent's Amboy Dukes". The band's second release on DiscReet Records, it was the final album released under the Amboy Dukes name before Ted Nugent launched his solo career the following year.

The band lineup on this album consists of Nugent, Rob Grange on bass and drummer Vic Mastrianni. The album has the feel of the outdoors (esp. "Hibernation") and Nugent's love for hunting and rock and roll; the backsleeve pictures him playing hard in front of an amplifier stack, next to a wild boar trophy.

Like on the Amboy Dukes' previous three albums, the credits are followed by a short tongue-in-cheek statement. This time, "Fear not the crusted warblers, but be wary of the Mad Cheese Grater for he shall slaw the features from your face. Beware the public carnivores as they inevitably edibly have a soft nosed hollow point magnum behind every bush."

"Great White Buffalo" is one of the mainstays of Nugent's catalog and was generated on this album.  
In an interview with Classic Rock Revisited he discusses how he and Grange developed the song idea: "This was yet another magical moment like the original musical burst of so many of my songs. This amazing lick/song erupted spontaneously during a recording session around 1972-73," Nugent says. "As I was tuning up my Blonde Byrdland, that pattern leaped forth with a force to reckon with. Killer bass player, Rob Grange, stopped me and asked what the hell that was, and I said "I don't know, just jackin’ around, tuning up." He told me to play it again, but I failed to play the lick the same as I had just done moments before and he kept badgering me to re-discover the lick. I didn't. But after recording some other songs, I again went to tune up my Gibson and the lick burst forth again. Rob Grange yelled 'That's it! That's it!' So I played it a few times, showed the guys where I wanted to stop and start it up again, turned on the tape machine and recorded it in one fell swoop, making up the lyrics as I went along, articulating to the best of my ability my take on the great Indian legend of the spiritual beast of yore. Rob Grange came up with that wonderful fluid bass melody at the end, Vic the thundering double bass drum assault, and history was made. To this day it is one of my and the audiences' and band's all time favorites."

Also featured was a cover version of "Maybellene", a 1955 classic of Chuck Berry (often quoted by Nugent in the late 70s as a major influence on his playing). Ted Nugent is credited for a one-finger guitar solo under the moniker "Rev Atrocious Theodosius".

The album includes one of very few "calm" Nugent songs of this era, "Sasha", which Nugent dedicated to his newly born daughter.

Due to Warner Bros distributing the album worldwide, Ted Nugent's music eventually began to reach overseas markets, but his royalties were not up to his expectations - DiscReet's manager & owner Frank Zappa reported mediocre sales. In late October 1974, rhythm guitarist Derek St. Holmes joined the band at least for one of the Amboy Dukes' final shows at Northeastern Illinois University in Chicago.

By 1975, Nugent abandoned the troubled DiscReet label and signed with Epic Records. He teamed with producer Tom Werman and Aerosmith’s managers, Leber-Krebs, who organized his live tours into commercially successful operations. The only Amboy Dukes member who continued with Nugent in his solo career is bassist Rob Grange. Nugent's band also included Derek St. Holmes on vocals and guitar, and drummer Clifford Davies; Ted Nugent moved forward to national and worldwide success.

In 1977, both of the Amboy Dukes' DiscReet releases were reissued by Warner Bros as a compilation entitled Two Originals of... Ted Nugent.

In the 1993 film Dazed and Confused, the character Wooderson, played by Matthew McConaughey, wears a t-shirt featuring the Tooth Fang & Claw album cover.

In 1995, "Tooth, Fang & Claw" was a song on the album Spirit of the Wild, which marked Ted Nugent's return to an outdoor lifestyle and his original sound of hard rock.

Track listing 
All tracks written by Ted Nugent, and arranged with Rob Grange, except where indicated
 "Lady Luck" - 5:57
 "Living in the Woods" - 3:54
 "Hibernation" - 9:19
 "Free Flight" - 4:03
 "Maybellene" - (Chuck Berry, Russ Fratto, Alan Freed) - 3:28
 "The Great White Buffalo" - 4:57
 "Sasha" - 3:06
 "No Holds Barred" - 4:48

Personnel
Ted Nugent – Guitar, vocals, percussion
Rob Grange – Bass, vocals, arrangements, composer
Vic Mastrianni – Drums, percussion
Andy Jezowski (and the Crusted Warblers) – Backing vocals

References 

1974 albums
The Amboy Dukes albums
DiscReet Records albums
Enigma Records albums